La Marseillaise de la Commune is a version of La Marseillaise that was created and used by the Paris Commune in 1871.

Lyrics

See also
 Worker's Marseillaise, Russian revolutionary song
  Worker's Marseillaise (German), German revolutionary song

External links 

1871 songs
Anarchist songs
Protest songs
Historical national anthems
French anthems
Paris Commune
La Marseillaise